60th ACE Eddie Awards
February 14, 2010

Feature Film (Dramatic):
 The Hurt Locker 

Feature Film (Comedy or Musical):
 The Hangover 

The 60th American Cinema Editors Eddie Awards, which were presented on Sunday, February 14, 2010 at the Beverly Hilton Hotel, honored the best editors in films and television.

Winners and nominees
References:

Film
Best Edited Feature Film – Dramatic:
 Chris Innis & Bob Murawski - The Hurt Locker
 Stephen E. Rivkin & John Refoua & James Cameron - Avatar
 Julian Clarke - District 9
 Mary Jo Markey & Maryann Brandon - Star Trek
 Dana Glauberman - Up in the Air

Best Edited Feature Film – Comedy or Musical:
 Debra Neil-Fisher – The Hangover
 Joe Hutshing & David Moritz – It's Complicated
 Richard Marks – Julie & Julia
 Roderick Jaynes – A Serious Man
 Alan Edward Bell – 500 Days of Summer

Best Edited Animated Feature Film:
 Kevin Nolting – Up
Christopher Murrie & Ronald Sanders – Coraline
Andrew Weisblum – Fantastic Mr. Fox

Best Edited Documentary Film:
 Geoffrey Richman – The Cove
Kim Roberts – Food Inc.
Don Brochu, Brandon Key, Tim Patterson & Kevin Stitt - Michael Jackson's This Is It

Television
Best Edited Mini-Series or Motion Picture for Television:
 Alan Heim & Lee Percy – Grey Gardens
 John Bloom & Antonia Van Drimmelen – Into the Storm
Lee Percy & Brian A. Kates – Taking Chance

Best Edited One Hour Series for Commercial Television:
 Lynne Willingham – Breaking Bad "ABQ"
Christopher Nelson – Lost "The Life and Death of Jeremy Bentham"
Leon Ortiz Gil – 24 "8pm-9pm"
Randy Jon Morgan & Jacque Toberen – ER "And in the End"

Best Edited One Hour Series for Non-Commercial Television:
 Louis Cioffi – Dexter "Remains to be Seen"
Louise Innes – True Blood "Hard-Hearted Hannah"
Stewart Schill – Dexter "Living the Dream"

Best Edited Reality Series:
 Kelly Coskran & Josh Earl – The Deadliest Catch "Stay Focused or Die"
Annie Tighe, Alan Hoang, Adrianne Salisbury & Kevin LefflerTop Chef "The Last Supper"
Jonathan Braun, Brad Ley, Sven Pape & Molly Shock Expedition Africa "Stanley and Livingstone"

Student Film Awards
 Andrew Hellesen - Chapman University
Adam Blum - Chapman University
Michael Hyde - American University

Honorary Awards
 Rob Reiner - Golden Eddie Award
 Neil Travis A.C.E., Paul LaMastra A.C.E. - Career Achievement Award

References

External links
 *ACE Award 2010 at the Internet Movie Database

60
2010 film awards
2010 guild awards
2010 in American cinema
February 2010 events in the United States